Stoned Fox is an anthropomorphic taxidermied fox that has become an Internet sensation in Russia.

The fox died of natural causes. It was stuffed in 2012 by Welsh artist Adele Morse (originally from Blackwood, Caerphilly, now based in Dalston, East London), who at the time was taking a Masters course at the Royal Academy of London and made it as part of a school project. She put the finished work on eBay where it surprisingly gained much attention.

At the end of 2012,  the fox quickly became an Internet meme in Russia. It has since been edited into famous paintings, photographs, videos, and other visual media.

See also 
 Lion of Gripsholm Castle
 Homunculus loxodontus

References 

Taxidermy art
Internet memes introduced in 2012
Internet in Russian language
Foxes in popular culture
Internet memes introduced from Russia
Individual taxidermy exhibits